The Blair Apartments are a historic residential apartment complex at 231 Chestnut Street in Salem, Virginia.  They consist of a series of seven connected buildings, forming a rough U shape on the west side of the street.  They were built in 1949 with funding from the Federal Housing Administration (FHA), and are a well-preserved example of the types of buildings the FHA funded.  Salem experienced a population boom in the years following World War II, prompting its construction.

The complex was added to the National Register of Historic Places in 2017.

See also
National Register of Historic Places listings in Salem, Virginia

References

Houses on the National Register of Historic Places in Virginia
Colonial Revival architecture in Virginia
Houses completed in 1949
Houses in Salem, Virginia
National Register of Historic Places in Salem, Virginia